The Machadinho Hydroelectric Power Plant is a dam and hydroelectric power plant on the Pelotas River near Machadinho on the border of Santa Catarina and Rio Grande do Sul, Brazil. The power station has a  capacity and is supplied with water by a concrete face rock-fill embankment dam. It is owned and operated by Machadinho Energetica and produces the equivalent of 37% of the energy consumed in Santa Catarina.

Background
Since 1966 and 1981, a series of studies were carried out on the Machadinho Dam and by 1982 a design was submitted and approved. The plant was slated to being commercial operations in 1993 but the project was delayed because of environmental concerns. The designers reevaluated the project and moved the dam's location further upstream on the river. After a new series of studies and new design were submitted, the project was approved in 1995. The design was prepared by Coyne et Bellier. Construction began on March 2, 1998 and by October 26, 1999, the river diversion was complete. By August 28, 2001, the dam was near completion and it began to impound the Pelotas River. On February 16, 2002, the first generator began to operate and by August 31, 2002 the dam was completed.

Machadinho Dam

Power plant
The first generator was commissioned February 16, 2002, the second on April 30 and the final on December 7 of that same year.

See also

List of power stations in Brazil

References

Energy infrastructure completed in 2002
Hydroelectric power stations in Brazil
2002 establishments in Brazil
Dams in Santa Catarina (state)
Dams in Rio Grande do Sul